Marcin Cebula (born 6 December 1995) is a Polish professional footballer who plays as a midfielder for Raków Częstochowa.

Honours
Raków Częstochowa
Polish Cup: 2020–21, 2021–22
Polish Super Cup: 2021

References

External links
 

1995 births
People from Staszów County
Sportspeople from Świętokrzyskie Voivodeship
Living people
Polish footballers
Poland youth international footballers
Association football midfielders
Korona Kielce players
Raków Częstochowa players
Ekstraklasa players